Sir Paul Robert Virgo Clarke, KCVO (born 1953) is a former Clerk of the Council of the Duchy of Lancaster, a position he held from 2000 until 2013.

Early life and education
Born on 13 August 1953 he was educated at Abingdon School in Abingdon-on-Thames from 1964 until 1971. He was a member of the tennis team and gained half-colours, he was also a prefect in School House and played hockey for the school.

Career
He started his career at the Grosvenor Estate in London as Assistant to the Executive Trustee.

He was the Clerk of the Council of the Duchy of Lancaster from 2000 until 2013.

In the 2009 New Year Honours he was appointed a Commander of the Royal Victorian Order (CVO). After leaving the role in 2013  Clarke was appointed a Knight Commander of the Royal Victorian Order (KCVO) in the 2013 Special Honours.

Since leaving the Duchy he has acted as Managing Director for several companies.

See also
 List of Old Abingdonians

References

1953 births
Living people
People educated at Abingdon School
Place of birth missing (living people)
Knights Commander of the Royal Victorian Order